Corallorhiza trifida, commonly known as early coralroot, northern coralroot, or yellow coralroot, is a coralroot orchid native to North America and Eurasia, with a circumboreal distribution. The species has been reported from the United States, Canada, Russia, China, Japan, Korea, India, Nepal, Kashmir, Pakistan, and almost every country in Europe.

Description
Corallorhiza trifida is yellowish green in color, leafless, and partially myco-heterotrophic, deriving some, but not all of its nutrients from association with fungi of genus Tomentella. It also contains chlorophyll, with which it supplies some of its own carbon nutrition via autotrophy.

References

External links

 Jepson Manual Treatment - Corallorhiza trifida

trifida
Orchids of Canada
Orchids of the United States
Orchids of Russia
Flora of Finland
Flora of Alaska
Orchids of Europe
Flora of Greenland
Orchids of China
Flora of Korea
Flora of Japan
Orchids of India
Flora of Nepal
Flora of Pakistan
Flora without expected TNC conservation status